S.L.O.B. (an acronym for Silver-Lipped Operator of Bullshit) is the debut full-length album by American deathcore band Dr. Acula.  It was released on May 29, 2007 through 187 Records.

Track listing

Tracks 3, 5, 7, and 9 are re-recorded songs from the Chillogy EP.
All song titles (excluding track 1) are again taken from book titles in the Goosebumps series.

Personnel
Rob Accardi – vocals
Bert Vegas – vocals, keyboard
Bill Graffeo – guitar
Lou "Dawg" Figurito – guitar, bass
Rob "Acula" Guarino – bass, guitar
Mike Cosentino – drums
Petey Poison – samples

References 

2007 debut albums
Dr. Acula (band) albums